Amanda Fahy (born 20 April 1985) is a British actress who played Shannon Parks in the CBBC TV children's series Grange Hill from 2001 to  2004.

She appeared in The Bill as Nikki McGrath in 2004 and a year later appeared in the Channel 4 drama Ahead of the Class about the murder of head teacher Philip Lawrence.

References

External links
 

1985 births
Living people
English television actresses